Mallory E. Horne (April 17, 1925 – April 30, 2009) was the speaker of the Florida House of Representatives, and president of the Florida Senate, becoming the third person in state history to hold both positions, after Ion Farris and Philip Dell.

Background 
Horne was a United States Army Air Forces pilot during World War II. After the war, Mallory continued to serve in the United States Air Force and Air Force Reserve, being later honorably discharged at the rank of captain. He attended the University of Florida, and served as the chancellor of the Student Government Honor Court in 1949.

Becoming a lawyer, Horne opened his own practice in Tallahassee, Florida, and was elected as statewide president of the Junior Bar of Florida (for lawyers under the age of 36).

Political career 
Horne served in the Florida State Legislature, rising to the positions of speaker of the Florida House of Representatives and president of the Florida State Senate.

Horne was the second post-Reconstruction person to serve as both speaker of the House and president of the Senate, after Ion Farris. He was credited as "chiefly responsible for keeping the state capital in Tallahassee against an effort to move it [south] to Orlando".

Horne left the legislature after an unsuccessful run for the Democratic U.S. Senate nomination in 1974, working as a lawyer and a lobbyist.

Scandal 
Horne was tried and acquitted in 1985 on charges of money laundering when federal investigators alleged that he had smuggled marijuana into the United States from the Cayman Island on the twin-engined airplane he piloted.

Family 
Mallory married Anne Livingston in 1944. They later had two sons, Mallory, Jr. and David. After divorce, he later married Mary Lou Reichert.

Death 
Mallory Horne died from lung cancer, aged 84, on April 30, 2009. He was survived by his wife, his son Mallory, Jr., and a stepson, Don. He was predeceased by his son, David Horne.

References 

1925 births
2009 deaths
People from Tavares, Florida
American lobbyists
Deaths from lung cancer in Florida
Democratic Party Florida state senators
People from Tallahassee, Florida
Presidents of the Florida Senate
Speakers of the Florida House of Representatives
Democratic Party members of the Florida House of Representatives
University of Florida alumni
United States Air Force officers
United States Army Air Forces pilots of World War II
20th-century American politicians
United States Air Force reservists